Horton Plaza, not to be confused with its adjacent namesake Horton Plaza Park, was a five-level outdoor shopping mall located in downtown San Diego. It was known for its bright colors, architectural tricks, and odd spatial rhythms. It stood on 6.5 city blocks adjacent to the city's historic Gaslamp Quarter. Opening in 1985, it was the first successful downtown retail center since the rise of suburban shopping centers decades earlier. In August 2018, the property was sold to developer Stockdale Capital Partners, which plans to convert it into an office-retail complex. RDC is the architect of record. Nordstrom closed in 2016, leaving a vacant anchor store, and the other major anchor, Macy's, closed in Spring 2020. The mall was demolished starting in May 2020.

History

1970s
A 1972 proposal for the shopping center and a redevelopment district arose out of plans to "refurbish San Diego's historic town plaza", Horton Plaza. Due to numerous setbacks and resistance from preservation groups, construction did not begin until 1982. The plaza is named for Alonzo Horton, who was largely responsible for the location of downtown San Diego.

1980s – 1990s

Horton Plaza was the $140 million centerpiece of a downtown redevelopment project run by The Hahn Company, and is the first example of architect Jon Jerde's so-called "experience architecture".  When it opened in August 1985, it was a risky and radical departure from the standard paradigm of mall design. The building's design featured mismatched levels, long one-way ramps, sudden drop-offs, dramatic parapets, shadowy colonnades, cul-de-sacs, and brightly painted facades constructed around a central courtyard.

Jerde's project was based on Ray Bradbury's essay "The Aesthetics of Lostness". In it he extolled the virtues of getting "safely lost" as adults inspired by side streets of Paris, London, or New York.

Horton Plaza was an instant financial success and while some credited it for revitalizing downtown San Diego, others said the revitalization benefitted the mall.

When originally built, the center housed the historic Jessop's Clock, built in 1907, which formerly stood on a sidewalk in front of the Jessop and Sons jewelry store in Downtown San Diego.

Weeks after the mall's opening in 1985, a man committed suicide by jumping from a third-story walkway in what was the first of five suicides to occur over the mall's history.

In 1994, Sam Goody and Planet Hollywood announced they would be opening stores in the former J. W. Robinson's site in 1995. In 1995, United Artists Theatres announced they would be building 7 new screens into 7 screens to make it 14 in 1996.

In 1997, FAO Schwarz opened on the 5th floor of the mall. 
In 1998, the owners of the mall sold it to the Westfield Group, which renamed the mall Westfield Horton Plaza. In 2014, Westfield split into two companies, Scentre Group for Australia and New Zealand malls, and Westfield Corporation for American and European malls. In 2018, Westfield Corporation was acquired by Unibail-Rodamco, and it was rebranded as Unibail-Rodamco-Westfield.

2000–2017

Planet Hollywood closed in 2001. 

In 2003, FAO Schwarz closed. It was replaced by Samba Grille, a Brazilian steakhouse in early 2006. Samba Grille closed in fall 2007 and it since then replaced with an antique furniture gallery/store in 2008. 

In 2006, Mervyn's announced they would be closing early that year. Express was replaced with Steve & Barry’s sportswear which operated until 2009. The upper level of the former Mervyn's was replaced with a variety of stores such as Forever 21 and Express in 2007.

The Musicland Group filed for Chapter 11 bankruptcy in January 2006, and in February it announced the closing of 226 Sam Goody and 115 Suncoast Motion Picture Company stores and all Media Play locations.

On January 11, 2011, the San Diego City Council unanimously approved a plan to raze the former Robinsons-May building on the north side of the mall to make way for a  urban park, effectively enlarging the adjacent, historic Horton Plaza and Broadway Fountain. Westfield partnered with the city to renovate and restore the area into an urban park and public gathering place called Horton Plaza Park. Westfield agreed to operate the park and schedule events, which could include concerts, movie screenings, and celebrations. Horton Plaza Park will have a 53,000 square-foot venue, a Cabrillo Theater, an interactive pop-jet fountain, and 23-foot-tall color-changing statues. The new Horton Plaza Park had its grand opening on May 4, 2016.

In 2012, FYE announced it would be closing its Sam Goody flagship store at Horton Plaza on October 31. That year, Regal Entertainment Group announced would be downsizing from 14 screens to 8.

In 2012, Westfield said it would not renew the lease on the Jessop's Clock and gave its owners (descendants of the clock's builder, Joseph Jessop) six months to find a new location for it. However, the heirs had trouble finding an appropriate location, and in 2019 the clock was placed in storage.

In 2013, armed police descended on the mall after receiving a tip that fugitive Christopher Dorner was spotted in the mall. One man was arrested by police, though it later was revealed to be a case of mistaken identity.
 
On June 24, 2016, Nordstrom announced it would close on August 26, 2016, leaving one anchor left in the mall.

On November 22, 2016, a local woman who had previously been reported as suicidal shot herself in the middle of the crowded mall after leading police on a chase.

In July 2017, a shooting occurred at the mall in which an active-duty Navy personnel was killed and his cousin wounded after getting into a confrontation with another man. Just three days after this incident, another man committed suicide by jumping from the plaza's balcony in an unrelated incident.

2018–present
In August 2018, the complex was sold to Stockdale Capital Partners, which planned to develop it into The Campus at Horton, an office and retail complex. They proposed an "innovation hub" focusing on technology and biotechnology companies, while retaining some retail, food and beverage, and entertainment offerings. They hoped to begin construction in 2019 with a completion date of fall 2020. The proposed redevelopment came under fire from architecture preservationists, who worked to corral votes to persuade city leaders to declare Horton Plaza a historic building.

Most of the center was closed; the few remaining retailers included Banana Republic and Victoria's Secret. The Regal cinemas in the complex, which opened in 1985, closed in February 2019. In April 2019, Jessop's Clock was dismantled and moved into temporary storage while it awaited a lease to be signed for its new location. By the summer of 2019, almost all of the stores in the mall were closed leaving only Macy's and 24 Hour Fitness still operating.

In January 2020, Stockdale Capital Partners announced it had reached an agreement with Macy's to close their store as part of a plan to close 125 stores nationwide, allowing redevelopment of the mall to move forward. Macy's closed in April 2020. Starting in May 2020, Horton Plaza was fenced off and began demolition; the plan is to redevelop it as primarily office space for a new tech hub called "The Campus At Horton". Completion is expected in 2022.

References

External links

 an evolution of the shopping mall urban form, with pictures of Horton Plaza
Information on Horton Neighborhood
Remarks of Senator John F. Kennedy, Horton Plaza, San Diego, CA

Buildings and structures in San Diego
Shopping malls established in 1985
Shopping malls in San Diego County, California
Gaslamp Quarter, San Diego
1985 establishments in California
Demolished shopping malls in the United States
Demolished buildings and structures in California
Buildings and structures demolished in 2020